Grotella blanchardi is a moth in the genus Grotella, of the family Noctuidae. The species was first described by Rowland R. McElvare in 1866. This moth species is found in North America, including New Mexico (its type location)  and Texas.

The wingspan is about 26 mm.

References

External links

Insect species described from Big Bend National Park, Texas

Grotella
Moths described in 1966